Croweology is an acoustic-based album by American rock band The Black Crowes, released on August 3, 2010. The set includes newly recorded versions of nineteen songs from the band's career, covering their albums from Shake Your Money Maker to Lions, plus a cover of the Chris Ethridge and Gram Parsons song "She", in mostly-acoustic arrangements. Critic Stephen Thomas Erlewine stated the Crowes capture "the sound of seasoned veterans still finding new ways to play old favorites" and the double album is "a generous, entertaining gift to the fans who have stayed true throughout the years". This would be the last recorded album to feature lead guitarist,  Luther Dickinson. Croweology was the last studio record released by the band before their hiatus lasting from 2013 to 2020.

Track listing
Disc one
"Jealous Again"  – 5:13
"Share the Ride"  – 3:58
"Remedy"  – 5:33
"Non-Fiction"  – 7:54
"Hotel Illness"  – 3:38
"Soul Singing"  – 4:15
"Ballad in Urgency"  – 9:16
"Wiser Time"  – 9:33
"Cold Boy Smile"  – 5:35
"Under a Mountain"  – 4:42

Disc two
"She Talks to Angels"  – 6:16
"Morning Song"  – 6:13
"Downtown Money Waster"  – 4:17
"Good Friday"  – 5:42
"Thorn in My Pride"  – 9:35
"Welcome to the Good Times"  – 4:01
"Girl from a Pawnshop"  – 7:08
"Sister Luck"  – 5:58
"She"  – 5:31
"Bad Luck Blue Eyes Goodbye"  – 7:03

Bonus tracks (iTunes only)
"Boomer's Story"
"Willin'"

Personnel

The Black Crowes
Chris Robinson – vocals, harp, guitars
Richard Robinson – guitars, vocals
Steve Gorman – drums
Sven Pipien – bass, vocals
Luther Dickinson – guitars, mandolin, banjo
Adam MacDougall – keyboards, vocals

Additional personnel
Charity White and Mona Lisa Young – backing vocals
Joe Magistro – percussion
Donny Herron – pedal steel, lap steel, banjo, fiddle

Charts

References

External links
The Black Crowes' Croweology Set For Release On August 3 at Swampland.com

2010 albums
The Black Crowes albums
Albums produced by Paul Stacey